Peter Akpatason (born November 28, 1964) is a Nigerian politician representing Akoko-Edo constituency of Edo State, Nigeria.

Early life and education 
Akpatason was born on November 28, 1964 in Uneme Nekwah in Akoko Edo of Edo State. He attended Akoko Edo Grammar for his secondary education in 1982, before proceeding to College of Education in Warri, Delta State.

Career 
Akpatason worked with Shell Petroleum Development Company of Nigeria before venturing into politics in 2011.

Politics 
In 2011, Akpatason contested and won election as a member representing Akoko Edo Constituency of Edo State.

References 

Edo State politicians
Edo State House of Assembly elections

1964 births
Living people